Primeval: New World is a science fiction television program, set in Vancouver, British Columbia, created by Judith and Garfield Reeves-Stevens. A co-production between Britain's Impossible Pictures and Canada's Omni Film Productions, for Space. The series is a spinoff of the British series Primeval. However, the two shows have little to do with each other. It was broadcast on Space in Canada, and on Watch in the United Kingdom. As with Primeval, the premise of Primeval: New World involves a team who has to deal with animals from the past and future that travel through time to the present day through anomalies. On 21 February 2013, it was announced that the series had been cancelled after a single season.

Plot
In the Primeval series, animals and people from the past and future travel through time to the present day via anomalies, fictional phenomena which act as portals through time. In Primeval: New World, set in Vancouver, British Columbia, anomalies begin opening in Canada. Evan Cross (Niall Matter), a software inventor who encountered an anomaly six years ago, creates the Special Projects Group to investigate the anomalies.

Cast

 Niall Matter as Evan Cross: an inventor specializing in software. Cross has been searching for anomalies after encountering an Albertosaurus six years prior to the start of the series. A lab in his company, Cross Photonics, is used as the team's base. Matter cited the action sequences as his reason for joining the show, and he performed many of the character's stunts himself.
 Sara Canning as Dylan Weir: a conservation officer and expert in predatory behaviour. Canning researched aspects of the role by contacting her aunt, a park ranger in New Brunswick, who was able to provide her with details on equipment and training for the character.
 Danny Rahim as Mac Rendell: an expert in firearms.
 Crystal Lowe as Toby Nance: the builder of the devices that track anomalies. In the episode "Babes in the Woods" It is revealed she is bisexual
Miranda Frigon as Angelika Finch: the CFO of Cross Photonics.
 Geoff Gustafson as Lieutenant Ken Leeds: a Royal Canadian Air Force officer and the head of the government's Project Magnet.

In October 2011, Haines indicated that characters from Primeval could appear in some capacity, stating "We've only got one at the moment... We haven't worked that out". Space and Impossible Pictures jointly revealed the cast of the series in March 2012. Andrew-Lee Potts, who played Connor Temple in Primeval, reprises his role in the first and final episodes. Potts indicated his character would be used to tie the two series together, saying Connor appears to "rectify something that may have gone wrong, and to try prevent it getting worse." In addition to the main cast, numerous former Stargate franchise actors, including Lexa Doig, Louis Ferreira, and Dan Payne, were cast in various guest roles.  Additionally Amanda Tapping directed three episodes.  Niall Matter's former Eureka co-star Colin Ferguson  guest-starred in one episode as a quirky scientist (basically switching the roles they previously played).

Episodes

Production

Development
Rumours of a Primeval spin-off date originated in June 2009 when, in an interview with Digital Spy, co-creator Tim Haines said "We're working on [a spin-off] with people in Canada". On 15 September 2011, Bell Media announced that Primeval: New World had been commissioned for Space as a co-production between Omni Film Productions and Impossible Pictures, stating "The series... will build on the UK Primeval mythology, taking place in the same universe that we've come to know and love. The story will centre on a new Canadian team of animal experts taking on whatever past or future creatures come through the anomalies that are now appearing around the world." Omni, Space, and Impossible Pictures collaborated for two-and-a-half years before announcing the series.

Primeval: New World was created by Judith and Garfield Reeves-Stevens. Haines is signed on as an executive producer, as are Sanctuary contributors Martin Wood and Gillian Horvath. 13 episodes were commissioned for the first series. Katie Newman of Impossible Pictures stated the tone will be "older, darker and scarier" than the original. Haines envisaged some crossover with Primeval but stated that the storyline would be mostly self-contained, describing it as a spin-off in the vein of CSI: Crime Scene Investigation. Corrie Coe, the senior vice-president of independent production at Bell, called it "a parallel yet independent series". In their press release, Bell Media said the "story and character development will move between the two series, uniting different plotlines."

Casting
Niall Matter and Sara Canning were announced as the leads for the show in March 2012. Speaking about his casting, Matter noted that producers were also considering Michael Shanks for the role, and would have been looking for an older cast if Shanks had been cast. In July 2012 it was confirmed that Matter's Eureka alum Colin Ferguson and Lexa Doig would appear as guest stars in the series, with Louis Ferreira and Dan Payne also to appear in the series. It was also confirmed that Andrew-Lee Potts would reprise his role as Connor Temple form the original Primeval series.

Filming and effects
Filming was scheduled to begin in Vancouver in late 2011, but did not get underway until 7 March 2012. The majority of filming took place in urban areas outside of the city; locations included Stanley Park, Granville Island, B.C. Place Stadium, and the Britannia Beach mines. Impossible Pictures began work on the scripts in October 2011. Final drafts were written by Horvath, Wood, Peter Hume, Jon Cooksey, Sarah Dodd, Katherine Collins, and Judith and Garfield Reeves-Stevens, with Wood, Amanda Tapping, Andy Mikita, and Mike Rohl signed on to direct. Filming for the first series concluded on 18 July 2012. The Bridge Studios served as the show's production centre.

While the computer-generated images for Primeval were created by Framestore and The Mill, the effects for Primeval: New World were done by the Vancouver-based company Atmosphere Visual Effects. Gabriela Schonbach of Omni said "Vancouver is the creative hub of visual effects for television, and we are the beneficiaries of a huge pool of talent in every area of TV production." Models for sixteen different species, including Pteranodon, Titanoboa, Daemonosaurus, Titanis, and Pachycephalosaurus, were created for the series. To simulate the creatures during filming, the effects team used a mixture of people and props to convey their locations to the actors; for the Pteranodon sequence in Stanley Park in the first episode, a man holding a stick with a tennis ball attached was used to give them an indication of the creature's size. Each episode contained over 70 computer-generated images. Visual effects supervisor Mark Savela noted the success of Steven Spielberg's Jurassic Park franchise had caused challenges in creating "a fresh spin on dinosaurs". The introductory sequence and titles were created by Vancouver-based The Sequence Group. To develop it The Sequence Group took inspiration from the concept of the anomalies, intermixing them with shots of the cast, and creatures from the first episode.

Cancellation
On 21 February 2013, The Hollywood Reporter reported that Primeval: New World had been cancelled after a single season. Low ratings for the series caused Space and Bell Media to decide against renewing the show for a second season.

Promotion
A 2-minute trailer for the series was released online in September 2012. Two Mobile apps, developed by the Calgary, Alberta company Robots and Pencils, were created for the iPhone and iPad. Primeval: dFX inserts creatures from the series into the user's video clips; Primeval: New World functions as a mobile game, with the user playing as a character from the series in the goal of keeping Vancouver safe from creature attacks.

Broadcast
The Canadian television channel Space is lead broadcaster for Primeval: New World, with episodes shown online following the cable premiere. Ztélé will broadcast the series to French Canada. In the United Kingdom, the series will be broadcast on Watch from 8 January 2013. Syfy acquired basic cable rights for a June 2013 premiere in the United States, with Hulu taking video on demand rights for the territory. NRJ 12 will broadcast the series in France. The international distribution rights are held by Entertainment One.

Home video release 
The complete series was released on a 3-disc DVD set in the UK (region 2) on 1 April 2013. It was later released in North America (region 1) on 22 October 2013 on both DVD and Blu-ray.

Reception

Critical response
Den of Geek columnist Philip Lickley enjoyed the first episode, stating that while it was "a little shallower" than Primeval, the ending "[sets up] what could be the most exciting element of the series." He noted several references to the original series, including the handheld anomaly detector and a cryogenically frozen Anomaly Research Centre member, as particular highlights. Alex Strachan of the Postmedia News agency had a favourable impression, praising the visual effects and describing the episode as "watchable and entertaining, the modern-day equivalent of '60s sci-fi TV classics like Voyage to the Bottom of the Sea and Time Tunnel."

Awards

References

External links

 Syfy channel website
 
 Primeval: New World at Impossible Pictures
  archived at the Wayback Machine

2012 British television series debuts
2013 British television series endings
2010s Canadian science fiction television series
2010s British science fiction television series
2012 Canadian television series debuts
2013 Canadian television series endings
Television series about dinosaurs
Canadian television spin-offs
British television spin-offs
Primeval (TV series)
CTV Sci-Fi Channel original programming
Television shows set in Vancouver
Television series by Entertainment One
Television series by Bell Media
Television shows filmed in Vancouver